Lothar Pongratz (7 January 1952 – 2 July 2013) was a German bobsledder. He competed in the four man event at the 1980 Winter Olympics.

References

External links
 

1952 births
2013 deaths
German male bobsledders
Olympic bobsledders of West Germany
Bobsledders at the 1980 Winter Olympics
People from Weiden in der Oberpfalz
Sportspeople from the Upper Palatinate